Sheikh Amri Abeid Memorial Stadium is a multi-purpose stadium in Kaloleni ward of Arusha in Arusha Region of Tanzania.  It is currently used mostly for football matches and serves as the home venue for Arusha FC. 
The stadium was the host of the 2011 Kilimanjaro Bowl, the first American football game played on the continent of Africa. It holds 20,000 people.

References

Football venues in Tanzania
Sport in Arusha
Buildings and structures in Arusha
Chama Cha Mapinduzi
American football venues